Gateway Regional High School is a regional school district and public high school serving students in seventh through twelfth grades from the boroughs of National Park, Wenonah, Westville and Woodbury Heights, four communities in Gloucester County, New Jersey, United States.

As of the 2021–22 school year, the school had an enrollment of 836 students and 82.9 classroom teachers (on an FTE basis), for a student–teacher ratio of 10.1:1. There were 184 students (22.0% of enrollment) eligible for free lunch and 41 (4.9% of students) eligible for reduced-cost lunch.

The district is classified by the New Jersey Department of Education as being in District Factor Group "CD", the sixth-highest of eight groupings. District Factor Groups organize districts statewide to allow comparison by common socioeconomic characteristics of the local districts. From lowest socioeconomic status to highest, the categories are A, B, CD, DE, FG, GH, I and J.

History
The name "Gateway Regional High School District" was chosen by a study committee in April 1962, using the term "gateway" that had been applied to that portion of the county. The committee was established after the Woodbury Public Schools notified the four sending communities of National Park, Wenonah, Westville and Woodbury Heights—which all had existing K-8 school districts—that their students could no longer be accommodated at Woodbury High School for grades 9-12 after the 1963-64 school year. The district's original plan called for creation of a regional junior high school for grades 7-9 while students already enrolled would continue to attend Woodbury High School for grades 10-12. After an June 1962 referendum was rejected in three of the four municipalities, the district was formally established after a second proposal was passed each of the four communities in December 1962, leading to the establishment of the first board of education.

Voters overwhelmingly approved a May 1963 referendum for $1.6 million (equivalent to $ million in ) to buy the land and construct of a facility on a plot covering  that was designed to accommodate an enrollment of 800 to 1,000 students.

The school opened for the 1964-65 school year.

Awards, recognition and rankings
The school was the 195th-ranked public high school in New Jersey out of 339 schools statewide in New Jersey Monthly magazine's September 2014 cover story on the state's "Top Public High Schools", using a new ranking methodology. The school had been ranked 141st in the state of 328 schools in 2012, after being ranked 197th in 2010 out of 322 schools listed. The magazine ranked the school 151st in 2008 out of 316 schools. The school was ranked 176th in the magazine's September 2006 issue, which surveyed 316 schools across the state. Schooldigger.com ranked the school 181st out of 381 public high schools statewide in its 2011 rankings (a decrease of 29 positions from the 2010 ranking) which were based on the combined percentage of students classified as proficient or above proficient on the mathematics (78.7%) and language arts literacy (93.9%) components of the High School Proficiency Assessment (HSPA).

Athletics
The Gateway Regional High School Gators compete in the Colonial Conference, which is comprised of public high schools in Camden and Gloucester counties, and operates under the supervision of the New Jersey State Interscholastic Athletic Association (NJSIAA). With 405 students in grades 10-12, the school was classified by the NJSIAA for the 2022–24 school years as Group I South for most athletic competition purposes. The football team competes in the Royal Division of the 94-team West Jersey Football League superconference and was classified by the NJSIAA as Group I South for football for 2022–2024.

The school participates as the host school / lead agency for joint cooperative cross country running, co-ed swimming and wrestling teams with Woodbury Junior-Senior High School. These co-op programs operate under agreements scheduled to expire at the end of the 2023–24 school year.

The field hockey team was the South II sectional champion in 1971 and won the South Jersey Group I state sectional championship in 2001.

The 1978 softball team ran their record to 18-3 after winning the Group II state championship by a score of 6-2 in the final of the tournament against a Queen of Peace High School that came into the game undefeated.

The 1992 boys' soccer team finished the season with a record of 21-3 after winning the Group II state championship, defeating Harrison High School by a score of 2-0 in the tournament final.

The boys' baseball team won the 2009 South Jersey Group I NJSIAA state sectional Title, advancing to the Group I tournament where they lost to David Brearley High School 6–2 in the semi-final round.

Administration 
Core members of the district and school administration are:
Dr. Shannon Whalen, Superintendent
Donna Contrevo, Business Administrator / Board Secretary
Jeffrey Pierro, Principal

Board of education
The district's board of education, comprised of nine members, sets policy and oversees the fiscal and educational operation of the district through its administration. As a Type II school district, the board's trustees are elected directly by voters to serve three-year terms of office on a staggered basis, with three seats up for election each year held (since 2012) as part of the November general election. The board appoints a superintendent to oversee the district's day-to-day operations and a business administrator to supervise the business functions of the district. Seats on the district's board of education are allocated based on the population of the constituent municipalities, with three seats assigned to Westville (the largest community in the district) and two each to National Park, Wenonah and Woodbury Heights.

Notable alumni 
 Grace Helbig (class of 2003), comedian, actress and internet personality.
 Steve Squyres (born 1957), principal investigator for the science payload on the  Mars Exploration Rover Project.
 Tim Squyres (born 1959), Academy Award-nominated film editor of Crouching Tiger, Hidden Dragon, Hulk, and Syriana, among others.
 Stephen Starr, CEO of Starr Restaurants.

References

External links 
Gateway Regional High School

Data for the Gateway Regional High School, National Center for Education Statistics
South Jersey Sports: Gateway HS

1964 establishments in New Jersey
Educational institutions established in 1964
National Park, New Jersey
New Jersey District Factor Group CD
Public high schools in Gloucester County, New Jersey
School districts in Gloucester County, New Jersey
Wenonah, New Jersey
Westville, New Jersey
Woodbury Heights, New Jersey